Alex Christiaan Vlaar (born 31 July 1996) is a Dutch-Bulgarian badminton player. He was born in Lelystad, the Netherlands. His father Chris Vlaar is a Dutch rally car driver and badminton coach, his mother is former badminton player Emilia Dimitrova who is also a coach. She played for Bulgaria at the 1992 Olympics women's doubles.

Career 
Born in the Netherlands, Vlaar is a former young Dutch badminton player who first played for the Netherlands team. He participated for the Netherlands at the 2014 BWF World Junior Championships, 2014 Youth Olympic Games in Nanjing, China, and the 2015 European Junior Championships in Lubin, Poland. Overall top 10 BWF junior ranking in all, he won several European Ranked Junior tournaments as well in singles, men doubles and mix doubles. In the Netherlands he won several national junior and open titles. He plays team competition at the highest premier Dutch club level (Eredivisie), first for BV Almere and now already a few years with Velo badminton from Wateringen with whom he became Dutch team champion in 2016 & 2017.

Vlaar has a double Nationality (Dutch and Bulgarian) and he decided to now play on a Bulgarian license to develop his badminton on the highest professional international level. Already in 2016 he became Bulgarian National senior champion in men's doubles with partner Philip Shishov and mixed doubles with partner Petya Nedelcheva. In 2017 he and Philip Shishov successfully defended the National men's doubles title. Alex is now selected for the National team of Bulgaria and together with Bulgarian mixed doubles partner Mariya Mitsova he already was runner-up at the 2016 Croatian International, and won the 2018 Bulgarian Open and the 2018 Bulgarian International.

Achievements

BWF International Challenge/Series (5 titles, 4 runners-up) 
Men's doubles

Mixed doubles

  BWF International Challenge tournament
  BWF International Series tournament
  BWF Future Series tournament

References

External links 
 

1996 births
Living people
People from Lelystad
Dutch male badminton players
Bulgarian male badminton players
Badminton players at the 2014 Summer Youth Olympics
Badminton players at the 2019 European Games
European Games competitors for Bulgaria
Sportspeople from Flevoland